"Strong Heart" is a song written by Tommy Rocco, Charlie Black and Austin Roberts, and recorded by American country music artist T. G. Sheppard.  It was released in May 1986 as the first single from the album It Still Rains in Memphis.  The song was Sheppard's fourteenth and last number-one on the U.S. country singles chart. The single spent one week at the top of the chart in August 1986.

Chart performance

References
 

1986 singles
1986 songs
T. G. Sheppard songs
Columbia Records singles
Songs written by Charlie Black
Songs written by Austin Roberts (singer)
Songs written by Tommy Rocco